Lieutenant Colonel Charles Terence Chichele Plowden (6 February 1883 - 13 July 1956) was a British army officer, military administrator and diplomat who served as political agent of the Baluchistan and Resident and Chief Commissioner of Coorg from 1933 to 1937.

Early life and education 

Plowden was born in Shimla on 6 February 1883 to Lieutenant Trevor John Chichele Plowden, a British army officer of the Punjab Commission. He was educated at Cheltenham College and the Royal Military College, Sandhurst. After passing out on 27 August 1902, his name was added to the Unattached List of the Indian Army, until he was in October posted to the Bengal command.

Career 

Plowden was appointed to the Political Department and served as Superintending Assistant Commissioner of the North West Frontier Province (1908–09), Political Assistant (1909), Assistant Commissioner, Dera Ismail Khan (1909) and political agent to the Baluchistan States (1920). In 1933, Plowden was appointed Resident to the Mysore Kingdom and thus, automatically became Chief Commissioner of Coorg Province. That very year, Plowden was made an Companion of the Order of the Indian Empire.

Later life 

Plowden retired in 1938 and served as a Press Reader in the British Embassy in Moscow during 1944-45. Plowden died on 13 July 1956.

References 

 

1883 births
1956 deaths
Companions of the Order of the Indian Empire